Ingleburn railway station is located on the Main South line, serving the Sydney suburb of Ingleburn. It is served by Sydney Trains T8 Airport & South line services.

History
Ingleburn station opened on 19 August 1883.

An additional track was opened to the west of the station in 1995 as part of the Glenfield - Ingleburn passing loop. This unelectrified track was used by freight and long-distance passenger trains. In December 2012, the track was incorporated into the Southern Sydney Freight Line and became freight only.

In April 2014, a major upgrade commenced. This will include lifts being installed at the south end of the station and a new structure on Platform 1. It was scheduled to be completed in 2016.

Since the second half of 2017, Ingleburn railway station has been served exclusively by the Airport and East Hills line, meaning commuters have to change at Glenfield to travel to either the city via Granville or to Blacktown via the Cumberland Line.

Platforms & services

The crossovers to the south and north of the station can be used to terminate trains if there is an obstruction (e.g. broken down train) ahead. In the early 2000s there were a few trains a day timetabled to terminate at Ingleburn, but these have since disappeared from the timetable. The signals at Ingleburn can be switched between automatic and controlled mode. In automatic mode, the signals will automatically change depending on where trains are detected and the points are locked in the normal position. In controlled mode, the signals and points can be controlled from Campbelltown Signal Box or the Rail Operations Centre at Alexandria.

Transport links
Interline Bus Services operate six routes via Ingleburn station:
868: from west side to Edmondson Park station
869: to Liverpool station via Edmondson Park station
870 Campbelltown Hospital to Liverpool station
871: Campbelltown Hospital to Liverpool station
872: Campbelltown Hospital to Liverpool station
873: to Minto

Ingleburn station is served by one NightRide route:
N30: Macarthur station to Town Hall station

References

External links

Ingleburn station details Transport for New South Wales

Easy Access railway stations in Sydney
Railway stations in Sydney
Railway stations in Australia opened in 1883
Main Southern railway line, New South Wales
Ingleburn, New South Wales